The 2005–06 European football season was the 102nd season of Sport Lisboa e Benfica's existence and the club's 72nd consecutive season in the top flight of Portuguese football. The season ran from 1 July 2005 to 30 June 2006; Benfica competed domestically in the Primeira Liga and the Taça de Portugal and also participated in the UEFA Champions League as a result of finishing first in the Primeira Liga the previous season.

After Giovanni Trapattoni led Benfica to their first league title in 11 years, he resigned for personal reasons. To replace him, the club hired Ronald Koeman, who was assisted by Bruins Slot and Fernando Chalana. Benfica remained highly active in the transfer market, signing and releasing over twelve players. Noticeable additions were Anderson, Léo and Nélson to the back four; Karagounis and Miccoli to the offence. The departures included Miguel, the biggest loss.

Benfica started the domestic season by winning their fourth Supertaça Cândido de Oliveira, beating Vitória de Setúbal one-nil. In the Primeira Liga, Benfica struggled initially, making their worst entry ever. Results improved following a European win against Lille, with Benfica climbing several places and defeating Porto in the Clássico. In late October, the team experienced a drop in form, going a month without a win. In December, Benfica's results improved in December, qualifying for the knockout stages of the UEFA Champions League for the first time in eleven years and winning nearly ten matches in a row, allowing them to get within three points of the top of the league.

In the final match of January, Benfica lost to Sporting CP and underwent another erratic period, losing two more league matches in February. A home win against Liverpool motivated them; they beat Porto and eliminated the reigning title-holders from the Champions League. This success was not replicated domestically; in mid-March, Benfica lost further ground in the Primeira Liga and were eliminated from the Portuguese Cup. Koeman's side recovered, but they were eliminated by Barcelona from the Champions League and failed to overtake Sporting when they dropped seven points in three match-days. At the end of the season, Koeman left the club by mutual consent.

Season summary

Pre-season
After leading Benica to their first league title in ten seasons, Giovanni Trapattoni departed the club for personal reasons. Faced with the task of finding a new manager for a second year in a row, Luís Filipe Vieira was quick to choose Trapattoni's successor; on the 5 June 2005, he said, "I already know who's the next manager". From the list of available managers, the press speculated on Paul Le Guen, Ronald Koeman and Javier Irureta. After a failed approach to Le Guen, Benfica selected Koeman as the next manager on 8 June 2005. His assistant would be Tonny Bruins Slot, replacing Álvaro Magalhães, who left the club after two seasons. Later in the month, Fernando Chalana returned to Benfica on a 2-year contract to serve on Koeman's technical staff.

To replace the "Italian" style of Trapattoni, Koeman wanted Benfica to have a "Dutch" approach; he said, "A team like Benfica always has to play to win. In what I know of this team, we can perfectly play in a 4–3–3," and that finding the right balance between offence and defence in the playing style mattered. Vital to his new formation, Koeman asked for more wingers, such as Andy van der Meyde, and Boudewijn Zenden, but Benfica did not sign them. Instead, he received attacking midfielders Diego Souza, Andrei Karyaka and Giorgos Karagounis. To improve Koeman's options up-front, composed of Nuno Gomes and Mantorras, Benfica tried but failed to sign Jon Dahl Tomasson. Koeman instead received Italian international Fabrizio Miccoli on loan from Juventus. In defence, Benfica added Brazilians Anderson, Léo, with Nélson replacing Miguel, who moved to Valencia.

The pre-season began on 4 July 2005 with medical exams, followed by the first training session on the next day, with two thousand supporters present at the Estádio da Luz. On 6 July, Benfica travelled to Nyon for a pre-season tour until 14 July. During the eight days in Switzerland, Benfica defeated Sion and Étoile Carouge. Back in Portugal, Benfica faced two Premier League opponents, losing to Chelsea, and defeating West Bromwich. Afterwards, Benfica played three Portuguese teams, winning against Barreirense and Estoril Praia, and drawing with Vitória de Guimarães. They ended their pre-season with a presentation match against Juventus on 6 August, losing 2–0.

August–September
Benfica began their season with the 2005 Super Cup, trying to win the trophy for the fourth time. On the 13 August, Benfica faced Vitória de Setúbal at the Estádio Algarve, winning 1–0 with a goal from Nuno Gomes. It was the first win in 15 years since 1989, breaking a five-time losing streak, all against Porto. Koeman praised his players, saying, "We played very well. I am happy with the work I have done with my players". On 20 August, Benfica began their title defence with an away game at the Estádio Cidade de Coimbra. The home team, Académica, held the score to 0–0 and won a point against Benfica. After the match, Koeman said Benfica had struggled in Coimbra. On 26 August, Benfica took part in the draw for the group stage of the 2005–06 UEFA Champions League; their first in the new century because they failed to qualify in the past two seasons. In 2005 the club ranked 57th in the UEFA coefficient, thus placing them on pot 4. They were drawn in Group D with Manchester United, Villarreal and Lille. The following day, Benfica hosted Gil Vicente for their final match in August. An unusual 3–4–3 formation did not work as planned; Benfica lost 2–0 and posted their worst league start since 1976–77. Koeman blamed anxiety in the players after Simão missed a penalty.

After an international break of nearly two weeks, Benfica returned to competition on 10 September with a Lisbon Derby against Sporting CP. Koeman played the same 3–4–3 as before, selecting Carlitos for the starting 11 in place of Nuno Gomes. Sporting scored first through Luís Loureiro in the first half, but Simão equalized with a free-kick in the second half. In the 75th minute, Liédson made the score 2–1 against a ten-man Benfica, ultimately winning the match for Sporting. With two losses and a draw in three match-days, Koeman broke a club record for the worst season start in history, already eight points from the top of the league. Four days later, Benfica made their seasonal European debut in the Champions League against Lille. The match was well fought between both teams, with Fabrizio Miccoli scoring a winning goal for Benfica in the 92nd minute. Koeman later said in the post-match interview, "We deserved this win because we search for it". On 18 September, Benfica hosted União de Leiria; Koeman reverted to the 4–2–3–1 formation that Giovanni Trapattoni regularly used. Benfica won 4–0 in the largest win all season, with Nuno Gomes netting a hat-trick. Koeman classified the formation as "ideal," and sid he wanted to use it more often in the future. The following Saturday, Benfica played on the road against Penafiel. A strong start put Benfica in the lead by 2–0 in the first 15 minutes, and despite conceding a goal, they won the match 3–1. Koeman attributed the win to the good momentum that Fabrizio Miccoli–Nuno Gomes were passing. On 27 September, Benfica travelled to Old Trafford to play Manchester United on the second match-day of the Champions League. United scored first through a Ryan Giggs free-kick that deflected off the wall; Simão levelled the score in the second half—also on a free kick—but United responded with a winning goal in the 85th minute through Ruud van Nistelrooy.

October–November
October began with a home match against Vitória de Guimarães. Miccoli opened the scoring for Benfica in the 20th minute, but Tiago Targino equalized a few minutes later. Simão put Benfica back in front with a deflected shot that beat Márcio Paiva, ensuring a third consecutive win that reduced the distance to the league leader to four points. After another interruption for international football, Benfica returned to competition with a Clássico against Porto. Despite Porto being the favourite to win, Benfica won 2–0 with two goals from Nuno Gomes. It was Benfica's first away win at Porto since 1990–91, when César Brito also scored a double. On the following Thursday, Benfica visited El Madrigal to play Villarreal. On the half-hour mark, Benfica lost their goalkeeper Quim to injury and replaced him with the 19-year-old Rui Nereu. In the second half, Villarreal scored from the penalty spot. Five minutes later, Manuel Fernandes levelled the score again. The draw allowed Benfica to remain in second place in Group D; Koeman was confident he could beat the Spaniards at home. On 22 October, Benfica hosted Estrela da Amadora for the Primeira Liga. Two second-half goals by Karyaka and then Nuno Gomes, gave Benfica their fifth consecutive win in the competition. Four days later, Benfica made their Portuguese Cup debut in the fourth round. Playing in Estádio do Bessa against Leixões, Simão's decisive performance opened the scoring in the 11th minute and scored Benfica's second goal that made the score 2–1. The month ended with an away match against Naval. Benfica were surprised by the home side and dropped two points in a 1–1 draw, costing them the chance to reach second place. Koeman was unhappy with the result, saying Benfica played better and deserved to win.

Benfica began November with a home match against to Villarreal. Benfica were hoping to win and take the lead in Group D but were defeated 1-0 with a winning goal for Villarreal in the 81st minute through a  strike from Marcos Senna. Despite the loss, Koeman remained confident in the qualification for the knockout stage; he said, "It is a very balanced group. We are missing four points to progress." On 6 November, Benfica played Rio Ave at home. The match was unusually competitive, with Benfica trailing twice and avoiding defeat with two free kicks from Petit. Koeman took the blame but criticized the referee's assistant for making several mistakes against Benfica. After a third international break, Benfica visited the Municipal de Braga on 19 November to play Braga. Benfica scored first through Anderson but could not prevent the comeback of Braga, first through Césinha and then Julio Bevacqua. Benfica responded with a Nuno Gomes goal in the 92nd minute, but Bevacqua gave the win to Braga three minutes later. It was Benfica's fourth consecutive winless game, the worst spell of the season. Three days later, Benfica played Lille on the road for match-day five of the group stage. Koeman surprised with a highly defensive team composed of four centre-backs in the back-four, two defensive midfielders, two fullbacks playing in the midfield and only two offensive players, Miccoli and Nuno Gomes. The match ended 0–0, achieving Koeman's goal of securing a point. For the final game of the month, Benfica received Belenenses on 27 November. They were unable to beat Belenenses' keeper, dropping two points in a 0–0 draw and extending their winless run to six matches, the longest dry spell since 2001–02.

December–January
On 3 December, Benfica travelled to Barreiros to play Marítimo. Under pressure from the run of poor results, Koeman asked his players to give it all to beat Maritímo. Benfica fended off Marítimo attacks, responding with a goal through Mantorras in the 86th minute and winning for the first time since 26 October. Four days later, Benfica hosted Manchester United for the last match of the group stage. United's Paul Scholes scored first but ten minutes later, Geovanni equalized 1–1 and in the 34th minute, Beto fired a shot from outside the box to make it 2–1. The result was unchanged and Benfica qualified in second for the knockout stages for the first time since 1994–95. On 11 December, Benfica played Boavista at home. Anderson scored for Benfica off a corner-kick from Petit; the only goal of the game. Koeman was happy with the win, saying, "We played well, as did the fans, who supported us. Like this, it is very difficult to beat us." On 17 December, Benfica continued their winning run, beating Nacional 1–0 with a goal from Nuno Gomes. The goal was controversial because of an alleged infraction of Luisão over Diego Benaglio prior to the goal. Koeman said, "I agree that it should have been signalled, like it should have been in many other instances". Benfica ended 2005 with an away visit to the Estádio do Bonfim. They struggled to beat Vitória de Setúbal's goalkeeper Marcelo Moretto throughout the game, only securing the win in the 90th minute through Nuno Gomes. The win was Benfica's fifth in December; enough to place them third in the league table just before the Christmas break.

Competition resumed on 8 January with a home game against Paços de Ferreira. New signing Moretto made his first appearance for Benfica. Nélson scored early, putting Benfica in the lead, with Geovanni setting the final score in the second half. With the win, Benfica climbed to second place, four points ahead of Sporting but ten behind leaders Porto. On 11 January, Benfica played Tourizense for the 2005–06 Portuguese Cup. Recently signed Laurent Robert scored the opening goal in the second half, while Nuno Gomes scored a second, letting Benfica progress to the sixth round. Four days later, Benfica hosted Académica at home. Early in the match, Roberto Brum touched the ball with his hand inside the box, giving Simão the opportunity to score the first goal; two more goals in the second half secured a comfortable 3–0 win for Benfica. The following day, Benfica signed Académica striker Marcel on a six-month loan. On 20 January, Benfica played away to Gil Vicente. A 10th-minute goal from Nandinho meant Benfica trailed for the first time in the season at the quarter-hour mark. The Lisbon-side responded with two first-half goals from Simão and Geovanni, while an own-goal in the second half confirmed the win for Benfica. It was their seventh consecutive league win, a feat not seen in 11 years since the 1994–95 season. On 28 January, Benfica played the Derby de Lisboa against Sporting CP.  Benfica scored first through Simão but they could not stop Paulo Bento's team from winning the match 3–1 at the Luz. Koeman said, "Sporting was much better on the pitch, before the 1–0 and especially after".

February–March
Entering the decisive part of the season, and still present in all competitions, Benfica's first game of February was a visit to Estádio Dr. Magalhães Pessoa to face União de Leiria. The home side startled Benfica, beating them 3–1. The loss, which Koeman called a small setback, granted Sporting the chance to catch Benfica in second place. On 8 February, Benfica met Nacional at home for the sixth round of the Portuguese Cup; the match ended in a goalless draw, even after extra time. Benfica won the match after a penalty shoot-out. Four days later, Benfica returned to the winning path in the Primeira Liga after beating Penafiel 4–0. Geovanni opened the scoring in the first half, after which Nuno Gomes, Simão and an own goal from Roberto set the final result. On 18 February, Benfica played on the road against Vitória de Guimarães. They did not play as expected and conceded two goals—one in each half—losing 2–0. The loss severely hampered their title defence after being overtaken by Sporting and Braga and allowing leaders Porto—their next league opponent—to gain an eight-point advantage. Three days after Guimarães, Benfica hosted Liverpool for the first leg of the Champions League round of 16. According to Adrian Harte, the match was "largely disappointing", but Benfica secured a vital win against Liverpool when Luisão scored with an 84th-minute header. The final match of February was a home to Porto, the second Clássico of the season. The high-tension match was decided with a  free kick from Laurent Robert that Vítor Baía could not stop. The win relaunched Benfica's title race and Porto's lead was reduced to five points. It was the first time in 29 years since 1976–77 Benfica had beaten Porto twice in the league and was also their first home win over Porto since 2000–01.

Benfica began March with a visit to Estádio José Gomes, home of Estrela da Amadora. The local team scored first through Paulo Machado in the first half, but Benfica scored two goals in the second half; the latter in the 91st minute. On 8 March, Benfica played the return trip of the Champions League against Liverpool. The Rafael Benítez-led side needed to recoup a 1–0 disadvantage but Benfica won the match. A long-range shot from Simão in the 36th minute and a volley from Miccoli in the 89th minute put Benfica into the quarter-finals for the first time in 11 years, eliminating the reigning Champions League title holders in the process. Koeman was thrilled with the win, saying, "This is why football is so nice—you can win against a bigger team, and anything is possible if you work for it". Four days later, on the same day they were drawn with Barcelona in the Champions League, Benfica hosted Naval at home. They failed to break Naval's resistance despite several attempts from Simão and dropped two points in a 0–0 draw. The draw threatened the hopes for a title renewal, as Porto and Sporting had distance themselves in the first two spots. On 15 March, Benfica suffered another setback at home. In the quarter-finals of the Taça de Portugal against Vitória de Guimarães, Benfica was surprised by the visitors and lost 1–0; the match's only goal was scored by Dário Monteiro. On 19 March, Benfica visited the Estádio dos Arcos to play Rio Ave. As with Estrela da Amadora, Benfica only secured the win in overtime, when Mantorras beat Mora with a 93rd-minute goal. Simão later told the press Benfica were still in the title race. Almost a week later, on the 25 March, Benfica hosted the fourth-place team Braga. The home team scored in their second attempt through Nuno Gomes and retained their slim lead until the end. Koeman was happy Benfica resolved the game so early, because in three days they met Barcelona. In the final game of March, Benfica faced Barcelona for the Champions League. Both goalkeepers were instrumental in securing a goalless draw; Moretto had the most work. Koeman was satisfied with the stalemate, predicting the second leg would be similar.

April–May

In April, Benfica were still battling for a Champions League semi-final spot while chasing Porto and Sporting in the domestic title race. On the first day of the month, Benfica played away to Belenenses. José Pedro scored first for the home team in the 9th minute, but Benfica's Miccoli equalized and seven minutes later, Karagounis scored again. Benfica won 2–1. Assistant manager Bruins Slot said, "The win allows us to keep pressure on our opponents and give us morale for Barcelona". The following Wednesday, Benfica visited the Nou Camp in the second leg of the quarter-finals. Barcelona pressured hard and almost scored in the first five minutes with a penalty kick, with Moretto defending Ronaldinho's shot. A few minutes later, the Brazilian scored to make it 1–0 for Barça from open play. Benfica had the best chance to level in the 61st minute, but Simão missed an opportunity. Samuel Eto'o scored a late goal for Barcelona, putting Barça into the semi-finals. President Luís Filipe Vieira said, "We were hoping to reach the final. We were awakened from the dream—every supporter was".

On 9 April, Benfica hosted Marítimo at home. They were caught off guard and briefly trailed by 2–0. Petit and a 96th-minute penalty from Simão equalized for Benfica. Nonetheless, the draw granted Porto the chance to increase their lead to nine points with four games left, making the title renewal "impossible," as Koeman described it. Six days later, on 15 April, Benfica played visitor to Boavista. Hoping to take advantage of Sporting's slip hours earlier and only battling for a direct qualification for the next Champions League campaign, Benfica beat the home side 2–0, with goals from Tiago and Mantorras. The win also broke a ten-year winless streak at the Estádio do Bessa, the last win being on 30 March 1996. On 23 April, Benfica played Nacional on Estádio da Madeira. Benfica led the game most of time, but conceded a late goal from Ricardo Fernandes and lost the chance to overtake Sporting. On 30 April, Benfica hosted and defeated Vitória de Setúbal 1–0 with a first half goal from Anderson. The win meant Koeman had surpass Giovanni Trapattoni's previous points total (67–65), but without the same glory; Porto had already won the league and Sporting was in good position to finish second.

On 7 May, Benfica played their final match of the season at Estádio da Mata Real. Benfica's Manuel Fernandes scored first but could not prevent Paços de Ferreira scoring three second-half goals, thus losing the game. Benfica ended the season in third place, missing out on the title and an automatic place in the 2006–07 UEFA Champions League. Despite winning both games against Porto, the closest Benfica had come from them was on the 18 and 19 match-days, with only three points. Benfica closed the season 12 points behind the leader and five from Sporting. Of the Big Three, Benfica conceded the most goals (29) and scored the second-highest number of goals (51), with the worst goal-average (+22). Koeman wanted to fulfil his contract with Benfica, but after negotiations with the management and sudden interest from PSV, Benfica opted to release him on mutual terms. Koeman thanked Luís Filipe Vieira and José Veiga for their support in face of repeated criticism, and said, "This is very big club, but you cannot win all the time, although I admit, that in the Primeira Liga, he did not do everything he could. We could have done better. But I say, It was a pleasure being here, now my career will continue elsewhere."

Competitions

Overall record

Supertaça Cândido de Oliveira

Primeira Liga

League table

Results by round

Matches

Taça de Portugal

UEFA Champions League

Group D

Round of 16

Quarter-finals

Friendlies

Player statistics
The squad for the season consisted of the players listed in the tables below and staff members Ronald Koeman (manager), Bruins Slot (assistant manager) and Fernando Chalana (assistant manager).

|}

Transfers

In

In by loan

Out

Out by loan

See also
 2005–06 in Portuguese football

References
 Specific

 General
 

S.L. Benfica seasons
Benfica